Northview High School is a high school in Brazil, Indiana.

About
The high schools of Brazil, Staunton, and Van Buren combined to create Northview High School in 1984. The student body of the 3 school selected the name "Northview" as well as their mascot, "Knights" and school colors: Silver, Maroon and Black. Northview has 1,194 students. Its athletic teams play in the Western Indiana Conference.

The school's nickname is "The Castle in the Cornfield" due to it being located near many cornfields.

The school won the 2016 Indiana Baseball 3A state championship.

The school was the 2018 Indiana Volleyball 3A State Runners-Up.

Northview High school's marching band  is known as the Marching Knights; the band and guard program is the proud owner of 14 State Championships.

The Northview Marching Knights have been crowned Indiana Class B State Champions nine times, State Runners-Up seven times, and have finished in the top five all but two years.

The Winter Guard is a two-time World Class Indiana State Champion and has made finals at the WGI World Championships 24 times.

The Indoor Drumline was the 2007 IPA Class A State Champions in their first year of competition. In 2008 they finished 2nd in the IPA Open Class State Finals.  In 2012 and 2013 Northview was the Class A Indoor State Champion. In 2018, Northview Indoor Percussion finished their season in 2nd place in IPA Class A Finals.

See also
 List of high schools in Indiana
 Western Indiana Conference
 Brazil, Indiana

References

External links
Northview High School
Northview Knights Athletics

Public high schools in Indiana
Education in Clay County, Indiana
Buildings and structures in Clay County, Indiana